The Archaeological Museum of Andros is a museum in Andros, Greece, established in 1981 following a donation from the Basil and Elisa Goulandris Foundation.

The building was designed by Stamo Papadaki.

The museum collections ranges from the Mycenaean era to the Roman period.

References

External links
Hellenic Ministry of Culture and Tourism
www.greeka.com
www.planetware.com

Andros
Museums established in 1981
Buildings and structures in Andros
1981 establishments in Greece